The Argentina men's national water polo team is the representative for Argentina in international men's water polo.

The team won the gold medal at the 2018 South American Games.

Results

Olympic Games
1928 — 1/8 finals
1948 — Second round
1952 — First round

World Championship
2015 — 16th place

Notable players
 Gonzalo Echenique (later Spain)

References

Men's national water polo teams
Men
Men's sport in Argentina